Leptobrama is a genus of fish in the family Leptobramidae found in the Pacific Ocean. This genus is the only member of its family.

Species
There are currently 2 recognized species in this genus:
 Leptobrama muelleri Steindachner, 1878 (Spot-fin beachsalmon)
 Leptobrama pectoralis (E. P. Ramsay & J. D. Ogilby, 1887) (Long-fin beachsalmon)

References

Percoidea
Marine fish genera
Monotypic ray-finned fish genera
Perciformes genera
Taxa named by Franz Steindachner